Kongos may refer to:

Kongo people, a Bantu ethnic group who live along the Atlantic coast of Africa from Pointe-Noire (Republic of Congo) to Luanda, Angola.
Kongos (band), a South African alternative rock/kwaito band.
John Kongos (born 1945), South African-born singer and songwriter of Greek ancestry

See also
Congo (disambiguation)
Kongo (disambiguation)